Demirci is a village in the Kovancılar District of Elazığ Province in Turkey. Its population is 124 (2021).

References

Villages in Kovancılar District